Plum in madeira is a popular dessert made with plum and madeira wine.

See also

 List of desserts

Desserts